Something to Believe In is a 1998 film directed by John Hough and starring William McNamara, Tom Conti, and Maria Pitillo.

Summary
From The New York Times - Lew Grade is the executive producer of this British-German co-production, a romantic drama that gets underway in Las Vegas with several casino cameos (Robert Wagner, Roddy McDowall, Jill St. John, William Hootkins). Lymphoma leaves Vegas croupier Maggie (Maria Pitillo) only a few weeks to live, so she sets out to visit a weeping Madonna statue in Italy where she meets American pianist Mike (William McNamara) while hitchhiking to Trevino. Monsignore Calogero (Tom Conti) orders the church closed, and the statue is found to be a fake. As Mike and Maggie hope for a miracle, Mike departs to participate in a Naples piano competition. Watch for composer Lalo Schifrin conducting his own two piano concertos in the final scenes.

Production
The film was produced by Lew Grade who put his own money in the movie. The film took four and a half years to raise finance for.

Reception
The film received poor reviews and was a box office failure. It could not obtain a US distributor.

References

External links

1998 films
Films directed by John Hough
1998 romantic drama films
American romantic drama films
Films scored by Lalo Schifrin
1990s English-language films
1990s American films